Antonio Vojak (19 November 1904 – 9 May 1975) was an Italian footballer who played as a striker or midfielder. His playing career was played out during the 1920s and 1930s.

He is most noted for his time with Italian sides Juventus and Napoli, for the latter of which he scored 102 goals.

His younger brother Oliviero Vojak played professionally as well, for Juventus and Napoli. To distinguish them, Antonio was known as Vojak I and Oliviero as Vojak II.

Career
Vojak was born in Pula, now in Croatia but then part of Austria-Hungary, and later ceded to the Kingdom of Italy in 1918.

Vojak's football career started with Lazio during the 1924–25 season, his stay there was very short; playing only 10 games but scoring 7 goals. This caught the attention of Juventus, who signed up Vojak within that year.

During his three-year stay with the Turinese team, Vojak was part of a squad which won the Italian Football Championship in 1926, amassing 46 goals in 102 games for the club in total.

He moved on next to Napoli, playing in a squad that featured Attila Sallustro. He stayed with the club until 1935, scoring over 100 goals for them. Vojak also appeared for the Italy national football team once in 1932 where he played midfield in the silver winning 1931-32 Central European International Cup campaign. Due to fascist anti-slav laws, he was forced to use the name Vogliani.

After leaving Napoli, Vojak played only two more seasons; first with Genoa and then with Lucchese-Libertas in 1936–37 where he played only 1 game. After retiring, he served as a manager. He died in 1975.

Honours
Juventus
Italian Football Championship: 1925–26

International 
Italy
 Central European International Cup: Runner-up: 1931-32

See also
 Croats of Italy

References

1904 births
1977 deaths
Sportspeople from Pula
Italian footballers
Serie A players
Serie C players
Juventus F.C. players
S.S.C. Napoli players
S.S.C. Napoli managers
Genoa C.F.C. players
S.S.D. Lucchese 1905 players
S.S. Lazio players
People from Istria
People from Austrian Littoral
Italy international footballers
Italian people of Croatian descent
Istrian Italian people
Association football forwards
Association football midfielders
Italian football managers